Lovetime is a 1921 American silent drama film directed by Howard M. Mitchell and starring Shirley Mason, Raymond McKee and Edwin B. Tilton.

Cast
 Shirley Mason as Marie Gautier
 Raymond McKee as Arthur de Sivry, Marquis of Savoy/ André Broque
 Frances Hatton as Margaret, Marie's mother
 Edwin B. Tilton as Lanstalot, Marie's father
 Mathilde Brundage as Marchioness de Sivry
 Clarence Wilson as Count de Baudine
 Harold Goodwin as Pierre Lavone
 Charles Smiley as Father Lesurges
 Correan Kirkham as Yvonne de Fourgères

References

Bibliography
 Solomon, Aubrey. The Fox Film Corporation, 1915-1935: A History and Filmography. McFarland, 2011.

External links
 

1921 films
1921 drama films
1920s English-language films
American silent feature films
Silent American drama films
American black-and-white films
Films directed by Howard M. Mitchell
Fox Film films
1920s American films